Saltwater River railway station was the first station at Flemington Racecourse, Melbourne. It opened on 1 October 1859, as a small station. However, over time it was expanded to include a double platform. The Saltwater River was a name early settlers gave the Maribyrnong River.

On race days, trains ran every few minutes, and it is estimated that the station carried over 12,000 passengers. According to records, it remained in regular service until approximately 1867. However, it is unclear what happened to the station in the period between the opening of Flemington Racecourse station opened in 1861, and its temporary closure several years later. The station remained in use in the mid-to-late 1860s, and itself closed when Flemington Racecourse station was reopened in 1867.

Disused railway stations in Melbourne
Railway stations in Australia opened in 1859
Railway stations closed in 1867
Flemington, Victoria